Boyds Corner is an unincorporated community in New Castle County, Delaware, United States. Boyds Corner is located at the intersection of U.S. Route 13 and Delaware Route 896, north of Odessa.

References

External links

Unincorporated communities in New Castle County, Delaware
Unincorporated communities in Delaware